Ludzas apriņķis was a subdivision of the Republic of Latvia and the Latvian SSR. Its administrative centre was Ludza.

History 
Established in 1629 as one of the four subdivisions (starostwo) of the Inflanty Voivodeship. In 1772, after the First Partition of Poland it became one of uyezds of Polotsk Governorate (1776—1796), later Belarusian Governorate (1796—1802) and Vitebsk Governorate (1802—1917) of the Russian Empire. On 31 December 1917 Lyutsinsky Uyezd, populated mostly by Latvians were transferred to Governorate of Livonia, becoming a part of the Latvian Soviet autonomy of Iskolat and a part of the Latvian Socialist Soviet Republic on 17 December 1918. After signing of the Latvian–Soviet Peace Treaty, Ludzas apriņķis was incorporated into the Republic of Latvia.

In 1949, Ludzas apriņķis was transformed to the Ludza District (Ludzas rajons) of the Latvian SSR.

Demographics
At the time of the Russian Empire Census of 1897, Lyutsinsky Uyezd had a population of 128,155. Of these, 64.2% spoke Latvian, 20.5% Belarusian, 7.1% Russian, 4.9% Yiddish, 2.2% Polish, 0.4% Estonian, 0.2% German, 0.2% Lithuanian and 0.1% Finnish as their native language.

References